George Evans (24 December 1915 – 11 April 1965) was an Australian cricketer. He played two first-class matches for Western Australia between in 1937/38.

See also
 List of Western Australia first-class cricketers

References

External links
 

1915 births
1965 deaths
Australian cricketers
Western Australia cricketers
Cricketers from Western Australia
People from Boulder, Western Australia